The Hudson Valley Intercollegiate Athletic Conference (HVIAC) is a member conference of the United States Collegiate Athletic Association (USCAA). It consists of eight small colleges in New York state. HVIAC's first championships were held in the 2004–05 season. Andy DeStephano, Athletic Director of Berkeley College, is the president of the conference and serves until 2021–22. His successor has yet to be named after the term expires. Similar to NCAA Division III rules, HVIAC membership is open to four-year higher education institutions that offer no athletic financial aid.

Member schools

Current members

Notes

Former members

Notes

Sports

See also 
 Mid Hudson Conference
 Penn State University Athletic Conference
 State University of New York Athletic Conference
 Yankee Small College Conference

References

External links
 

College sports conferences in the United States
College sports in New York (state)
United States Collegiate Athletic Association
Hudson Valley